"Down at the Roadside Inn" is a song written by Al Dexter, performed by Dexter (and his Troopers), and released in 1947 on the Columbia label (catalog no. 37303). In May 1947, it peaked at No. 4 on the Billboard folk chart. It was also ranked as the No. 16 record on the Billboard 1947 year-end folk juke box chart.

References

American country music songs
1947 songs